Melvin James Steiner (November 29, 1916 – May 6, 1997) was a professional baseball umpire who worked in the National League from 1961 to 1972. Steiner umpired 1,917 major league games in his 12-year career. He umpired in two World Series (1966 and 1972), two All-Star Games (1962 and 1968) and the 1969 National League Championship Series.

See also 

 List of Major League Baseball umpires

References

External links
The Sporting News umpire card

1916 births
1997 deaths
Major League Baseball umpires
Minor league baseball players
Sportspeople from New York City